Harry Turner is the name of:
 Harry Turner (Australian politician) (1905–1988)
 Harry Turner (American football) (died 1914), professional football player
 Harry Turner (boxer) (1894–1976), Canadian Olympic boxer
 Harry Turner (footballer) (1882–1967), English footballer with Southampton FC in the early 20th century
 Harry E. Turner (1927–2004), member of the Ohio House of Representatives
 Harry Moreton Stanley Turner (1875–1951), Senior Physician to the RAF
 Harry Turner, leader of the Turnerites within Trotskyist politics in the United States of America

See also
Harold Turner (disambiguation)
Henry Turner (disambiguation)